Devil's Thumb may refer to the following mountains or landmarks:

 Devils Thumb, a mountain on the Alaska–British Columbia border
 Devils Thumb (Washington), a mountain in the Cascade Range in Washington state
 Devil's Thumb (Greenland), a mountain on Kullorsuaq Island in northwestern Greenland
 Devil's Thumb (Hot Spring), an inert hot spring in Mammoth Hot Springs, Yellowstone National Park
 Devil's Thumb (California), a prominent rock outcrop in the American River (middle Fork) canyon, California
 Devil's Thumb (Queensland), a prominent rocky outcrop in Far North Queensland, Australia